The 1976–77 Liga Bet season was the first in which Liga Bet was the fourth tier of Israeli football due to the formation of Liga Artzit.

Hapoel Tiberias, Hapoel Beit Eliezer, Hapoel Kiryat Ono and Hapoel Lod won their regional divisions and promoted to Liga Alef.

North Division A

North Division B

South Division A

South Division B

References
Memo no. 152 IFA 
Beit Eliezer - Almost relegated - Promoted at Saturday (Page 9) Hadshot HaSport, 17.4.77, archive.football.co.il 
Liga Bet (Page 9) Hadshot HaSport, 24.4.77, archive.football.co.il 
Liga Bet (Page 7) Hadshot HaSport, 2.5.77, archive.football.co.il 

Liga Bet seasons
Israel
4